Judith Emike Audu-Foght, professionally known as Judith Audu, is a Nigerian film and television producer, director, casting director, actress, presenter, model and blogger. She is widely known for her movie production credits which include Just Not Married, The Family  and The Sessions. In 2019, she was listed among the YNAIJA 100 most Influential Nigerians in Film.

As an award winning Nigerian actress and film maker, she has passion for social justice and she has been supporting the  UN Refugee Agency (UNHCR) since 2019. She also uses her platform to educate on issues relating sexual and gender based violence; this influenced the creation of her film "Not Right" which raises awareness on the domestic violence in Nigerian society and also encourages women to voice out. Judith Audu, been the currently, Nigeria's most sought after young producers in the movie industry; who began her career as an actress and has emerge to be a producer of international reckon. Her first feature film production "Just Not Married" was one of the eight Nollywood movies that was selected which premiered at the Toronto Film Festivals (TIFF) in Canada.

Early life
Audu was born in Navy Town, Ojo to a Naval Personnel father; Audu Ali Audu and mother; Gift Salamat Audu. Her mother was a restaurateur and entrepreneur that owned a chain of restaurants and a rental service for events. Judith has two brothers, elder brother Franklin Audu and a younger brother Abdulmalik Audu. She is the second child and only daughter. She is from the Auchi area of Edo State in the southern part of Nigeria.

Audu attended Navy Town Primary School, Ojo, from 1988 to 1993, then proceeded to Navy Town Secondary School from 1993 to 1999, where she majored in the Arts. She then went to the Nigerian French Language Village, Badagry in 2001 and obtained a Diploma that she used in getting a Direct Entry into the University of Lagos in 2002.
 
In 2005, Audu obtained a B.A in French from the University of Lagos. After her National Youth Service (NYSC) In Kebbi State in 2006/2007, She went back to the University of Lagos and applied for master's degree course in Public and International Affairs from 2008 to 2010, where she graduated with a degree in Masters of Public and International Affairs (MPIA).

Career
While at the University of Lagos, Audu joined a theater group called the Campus Playhouse and took part in several stage productions. From there she auditioned to be a part of Theater 15 which was the most respected theater group in the University of Lagos at the time. It was from these theatre groups that Audu honed her acting skills and worked alongside Nigerian television personality Denrele Edun, actor/comedian Koffi and Director Wole Oguntokun.

In 2004, when the University of Lagos went on a ten-month strike, Audu was invited by her colleague Denrele Edun to Alpha Vision Company where she auditioned for and got her first role on the small screen in Tajudeen Adepetu's TV Series, One Love. In the same year, Audu officially registered herself as an actor with the Actor's Guild of Nigeria and began attending auditions, through which she got a role in a Ghetto film by Femi Ogedegbe titled Tears of the Ghetto (Life is beautiful). At the end of the University strike, Audu went back to school and took a hiatus from acting, although she did take a part in an independent children's series, Funtime, where she played the role of Vanessa.

During her compulsory National Youth Service, she was the presenter and producer of a programme on Kebbi State Television called French For Beginners and was also the Drama Troupe Director.

In 2011, after completing her master's degree program, Audu attended an audition for a role in the television drama, Tinsel and got the role of a gynaecologist, she has since been part of several Television Series like Emerald, Seekers, Burning Spears, Tinsel, Huzzel, 4 Walls, Comfort Zone, Rush, Funtime, Life is Beautiful, Case File, House Apart and Queens Drive.

In 2014, Audu produced her first film, a short film on domestic violence titled 'Not Right', which starred Omowunmi Dada, Ani Iyoho, Philip Festus and Judith Audu.

In 2014,  Audu began airing a radio show on a popular online radio station, Igroove Radio tagged Meet the Actor With Judith Audu where she does personality chats with Actors from all over the world.

In May 2016, Audu produced and premiered her first ever, full-length feature film, under her production company, Judith Audu Productions. The movie, titled Just Not Married features Stan Nze, Rotimi Salami, Ijeoma Agu, Obutu Roland, Brutus Richard, Gregory Ojefua, Judith Audu and Perpetua Adefemi. The movie enjoyed rave reviews and topped cinema ratings across Nigeria in the first few weeks of its release.

Personal life
Judith Audu married Morten Foght on 1 July 2011.

Audu is an avid blogger and has two blogs: www.judithaudu.blogspot.com where she profiles up and coming artists and does entertainment news, and the other is www.playingwithrecipes.blogspot.com where she shares food recipes she plays with as she is also a foodie and loves experimenting and trying out recipes from all over the world.

Awards and recognition
In 2013, she was nominated for the Best Female Actor Award 2013 at the Nigerian Broadcasting Merit Award.

In December 2014, Audu won the award for Best Actress at the In-Short International Film Festival 2014 for her role in the short-film, Alpha Mom.

Audu's short film Not Right, which she produced and starred in was nominated for the 2015 Africa Magic Viewers Choice Awards as 'Best Short Film', the film was also nominated at the Best of Nollywood Awards, Nollywood Movie Awards and at the Abuja International Film Festival in 2014.

In 2016, Audu won the award for Best Actress at the Best of Nollywood Awards for the movie Just Not Married. Audu won the award for Best Actress in a Supporting Role (African Film in English) for the movie Obsession at the 22nd African Film Awards in the UK in November 2018, as well as at the Toronto International Nollywood Film Festival for her role in the movie Unfinished Business.

In February 2020, the United Nations High Commission for Refugees (UNHCR) named Audu as a "high profile supporter" for its "Telling the Real Story" (TRS) project.

In April 2021, she was given a recognition award at the Eko Star Film and TV Awards.

She also received a commendation for her work from the Lagos State Ministry of Tourism, Arts, and Culture in 2021.

Filmography

Production credits

Directorial credits

Acting credits

See also
List of Nigerian bloggers

References

Nigerian bloggers
Nigerian women bloggers
Nigerian television actresses
Year of birth missing (living people)
Living people
Actresses from Lagos
University of Lagos alumni
21st-century Nigerian actresses
21st-century Nigerian women writers
Nigerian female adult models
Nigerian television producers
Nigerian film producers
Nigerian television presenters
Casting directors
Women casting directors
Nigerian female models
Actresses from Edo State
Nigerian film directors